The 1st Battle Squadron was a naval squadron of the British Royal Navy consisting of battleships.  The 1st Battle Squadron was initially part of the Royal Navy's Grand Fleet.  After World War I the Grand Fleet was reverted to its original name, the Atlantic Fleet. The squadron changed composition often as ships were damaged, retired or transferred.

History

First World War
As an element in the Grand Fleet, the Squadron participated in the Battle of Jutland.

August 1914

On 5 August 1914, the squadron was constituted as follows:
 HMS Marlborough
 HMS Collingwood
 HMS Colossus
 HMS Hercules
 HMS Neptune
 HMS St. Vincent
 HMS Superb
 HMS Vanguard

Battle of Jutland, June 1916

During the Battle of Jutland, the composition of the 1st Battle Squadron was as follows:
 Sixth Division
 HMS Marlborough Flagship of Vice-Admiral Sir Cecil Burney; Captain G. P. Ross;
 HMS Revenge Captain E. B. Kiddle;
 HMS Hercules Captain L. Clinton-Baker;
 HMS Agincourt Captain H. M. Doughty;
 Fifth Division
 HMS Colossus Flagship of Rear Admiral E. F. A. Gaunt; Captain A. D. P. R. Pound;
 HMS Collingwood Captain J. C. Ley;
 HMS St. Vincent Captain W. W. Fisher;
 HMS Neptune Captain V. H. G. Bernard;

1917 and 1918

Following the Battle of Jutland, the 1st Battle Squadron was reorganized, with Colossus, Hercules, St. Vincent, Collingwood and Neptune all transferred  to the 4th Battle Squadron. In January 1917, the squadron was constituted as follows:
 HMS Marlborough
 HMS Agincourt
 HMS Benbow – joined July, 1916
 HMS Canada
 HMS Emperor of India – joined July, 1916
 HMS Revenge
 HMS Royal Oak – joined May, 1916
 HMS Royal Sovereign – joined June, 1916

By 1918, Agincourt had been transferred to the 2nd Battle Squadron, and Resolution, Ramillies and Iron Duke had joined the squadron on completion.

Second World War
For many years the squadron served in the Mediterranean as the main British battle force there. On 3 September 1939 the 1st Battle Squadron, serving in the Mediterranean Fleet, consisted of Barham, Warspite and Malaya, with headquarters at Alexandria, Egypt, under the command of Vice-Admiral Geoffrey Layton.

In December 1943 the Squadron was under the command of Vice Admiral Arthur Power. The Admiralty sent this force out to India under the title of the First Battle Squadron.

From November 1944, the squadron served in the British Pacific Fleet under the command of Vice-Admiral Henry Rawlings, who also served as Second-in-Command of the Fleet.

Admirals commanding
Commanders were as follows:
 Vice-Admiral Sir Stanley Colville (1912–14)
 Vice-Admiral Sir Lewis Bayly (June–December 1914)
 Admiral Sir Cecil Burney (1914–16)
 Vice-Admiral Sir Charles Madden (1916–19)
 Vice-Admiral Sir Sydney Fremantle (1919–21)
 Vice-Admiral Sir William Nicholson (1921–22)
 Vice-Admiral Sir Edwyn Alexander-Sinclair (1922–24)
 Rear-Admiral William Fisher (1924–25)
 Rear-Admiral Cecil Staveley (1925–26)
 Vice-Admiral Sir Michael Hodges (1926–27)
 Vice-Admiral Sir John Kelly (1927–29)
 Vice-Admiral Howard Kelly (1929–30)
 Vice-Admiral Sir William Fisher (1930–32)
 Vice-Admiral Sir Roger Backhouse (1932–34)
 Vice-Admiral Sir Charles Forbes (1934–36)
 Vice-Admiral Hugh Binney (1936–38)
 Rear-Admiral Ralph Leatham (1938–39)
 Vice-Admiral Geoffrey Layton (January–November 1939)
 Rear-Admiral Henry Pridham-Wippell (July–October 1940)
 Vice-Admiral John Tovey (October–December 1940)
 Rear-Admiral Bernard Rawlings (1940–41)
 Vice-Admiral Sir Henry Pridham-Wippell (1941–42)
 Vice-Admiral Sir Arthur Power (1943–44)
 Vice-Admiral Sir Bernard Rawlings (1944–45)

Rear-Admirals, Second-in-Command
Post holders included:
 Rear-Admiral Charles E. Madden, 5 January 1912 – 10 November 1912
 Rear-Admiral The Hon. Somerset A. Gough-Calthorpe, 10 December 1912  – 10 December 1913
 Rear-Admiral Hugh Evan-Thomas, 10 December 1913  – 25 August 1915
 Rear-Admiral Ernest Gaunt, 25 August 1915  – 12 June 1916
 Rear-Admiral Alexander L. Duff, 12 June 1916  – 30 November 1916
 Rear-Admiral Sir William C. M. Nicholson, 1 December 1916  – 20 March 1919
 Rear-Admiral The Hon. Victor A. Stanley, 1 April 1919  – 1 April 1920
 Rear-Admiral Henry M. Doughty, 24 March 1920  – 14 April 1921
 Rear-Admiral Sir Rudolf W. Bentinck, 3 May 1921  – 3 May 1922
 Rear-Admiral Arthur A. M. Duff, 3 May 1922
 Rear-Admiral William A. H. Kelly, 3 May 1923
 Rear-Admiral William H. D. Boyle, 3 May 1924  – 3 May 1924
 Rear-Admiral William W. Fisher, 14 October 1924 – 7 September 1925
 Rear-Admiral Cecil M. Staveley, 15 October 1925 – 1 October 1926
 Rear-Admiral David T. Norris, 1 October 1926
 Rear-Admiral Bernard St. G. Collard, 1 October 1927
 Rear-Admiral William M. Kerr, 20 March 1928  – 5 April 1929
 Rear-Admiral The Hon. Reginald A. R. P.-E.-E.-Drax, 12 April 1929  – 26 April 1930
 Rear-Admiral Henry D. Pridham-Wippell, 8 May 1940 – 24 October, 1941

References

External links
 First Battle Squadron at DreadnoughtProject.org
 Royal Navy History
 Composition of the Grand Fleet

Battle squadrons of the Royal Navy
Ship squadrons of the Royal Navy in World War I
Squadrons of the Royal Navy in World War II
Military units and formations established in 1912
Military units and formations disestablished in 1945